Abraham Laverton (3 October 1819 – 31 October 1886), of Westbury, Wiltshire, was an English cloth mill owner, Liberal Member of Parliament for the parliamentary borough of Westbury from 1874 to 1880, and philanthropist.

Early life
Born in Trowbridge in 1819, and baptized into the Church of England on 9 October, Laverton was one of the four sons of William Laverton, a master weaver, and his wife Penelope Davis, who had married in Trowbridge in October 1803. Laverton grew up there in Newtown. Apart from three brothers, he also had a sister, Charlotte. In March 1825 his mother died, aged 41.

As well as being a weaver, Laverton’s father was a contractor with clothiers, sharing his contracts with other weavers. The Laverton children had some education, but in their youth they also worked as weavers. Abraham gained a job in the counting house of Court Mill, Trowbridge, before moving to Sheppards Mill, Frome, where he worked in sales and made contacts useful in his later career.

William Laverton, of Newtown, Trowbridge, died in October 1842, leaving property valued at less than £200.

Mill owner
In 1849, Laverton leased the Angel Mill, Westbury, from the trustees of William Matravers and converted it to produce cloth. In 1852 he bought the mill, while in the same year James Wilson, the Whig Member of Parliament for Westbury, and his brother William bought Bitham Mill in the same town. In 1856, the Wilson brothers sold their mill to Laverton. For part of the middle of the 19th century he also owned Boyer's Mill, Westbury. As well as being a manufacturer, Laverton was a speculative buyer of cloth and wool.

Politician
Laverton became a Westbury Justice of the Peace, and in 1864 a dispute arose between him and Charles Paul Phipps as to their seniority as magistrates.

In 1866, he was named as an additional Commissioner "for executing the Acts for granting a Land Tax and other Rates and Taxes", when he was described as "Abraham Laverton Esquire, Westbury House, Westbury".

From 1868, Laverton stood unsuccessfully for parliament in Westbury as a Liberal, first against the Conservative John Lewis Phipps, when he lost by only twenty-seven votes. Although Phipps was elected, the result was declared void as a result of an election petition brought by Laverton. Mr Justice Willes found that, although Phipps himself was personally innocent of any corrupt practice, his agent, Harrop, had carried out acts of intimidation on voters. The Judge found that Harrop, who was an agent of Phipps and a manufacturer in Westbury, "had told his workmen that no man should remain in his employment who voted for the Petitioner, who was his rival in trade, and that these men or some of them were obliged to leave his employment in consequence of their refusing to abstain from so voting". In 1869, a by-election was thus held to fill the vacancy, at which Laverton lost by only eleven votes, defeated by his rival's brother, Charles Paul Phipps, standing for the Conservatives. At the 1874 election he was finally elected as the borough's Member of Parliament. However, there is no record that he ever spoke in the House of Commons.

In 1874, a poem called Warblings from Westbury was published, poking fun at Laverton in his new role as Member of Parliament. In the same year, he printed a circular to the shareholders of the Manchester, Sheffield and Lincolnshire Railway offering himself to them as a director. 
 
Laverton was defeated at the 1880 election by Charles Phipps's son, Charles N. P. Phipps. Following this defeat, he filed a petition in the High Court to have the result of the election annulled on the grounds of bribery, treating, and undue influence on the part of his Conservative opponent. This failed, rejected by Sir Robert Lush and Sir Henry Manisty, two Justices.

Public works
In 1869, shortly after his second election defeat, Laverton built Prospect Square, Westbury, a development of thirty-nine houses, of which thirty-two were for his mill workers and seven were almshouses, around three sides of a large open space which before that had been used as allotments. Some of these houses are now listed buildings.

In 1873, the year before his one election success, Laverton founded and built the Laverton Institute in Bratton Road, Westbury, as a recreational centre; the building continues in use as a community facility, managed by the Town Council. The Institute included a room for a school which already existed, the Westbury Boys' British School, which moved into the Laverton Institute in 1874 and in 1907 changed its name to the Westbury Laverton Institute School. It remained in the building until 1925, when it was merged into what is now Matravers School.

In 1884, Laverton also built a new school in Bratton Road, near his Institute, and presented it to the town. This opened its doors in 1885 and was known as the Laverton Infants' School, then the Laverton County Infants' School, after being adopted by Wiltshire County Council. In 1958, it moved into premises in the churchyard, the former Church of England Junior School, and in 1968 moved again to Eden Vale, becoming the Westbury Infants' School. The original building in Bratton Road is now a private house.

The great west window of Westbury's All Saints parish church was donated by Abraham Laverton.

Laverton is sometimes stated as the founder of the public baths in Church Street, Westbury. While these were his conception, they were completed and given to the town in 1887, shortly after his death, by his nephew William Henry Laverton (1845–1935).

Death
Laverton died on 31 October 1886 at Farleigh Castle, Farleigh Hungerford, leaving a personal estate valued for probate at £647,416, .

A lifelong bachelor who lived his whole adult life with his sister, Charlotte, Laverton was succeeded by a nephew, W. H. Laverton, who continued the firm he had founded, A. Laverton & Co. Ltd. This was still making cloth in Westbury in the Angel and Bitham Mills in the 1960s.

Laverton’s sister Charlotte outlived him, settling at Bradford on Avon and dying there on 21 July 1890.

References

B. Little, A history of the firm of A. Laverton & Co. Ltd. (unpublished)

External links
 
Mr Abraham Laverton at theyworkforyou.com
Laverton Hall, Westbury, Laverton Institute Trust
Prospect Square, Westbury, at geograph.org.uk, built by Laverton

1819 births
1886 deaths
Liberal Party (UK) MPs for English constituencies
UK MPs 1874–1880
19th-century English businesspeople
English philanthropists
British textile industry businesspeople
People from Trowbridge
People from Westbury, Wiltshire